EDIETS may refer to:

eDiets.com, an online dietary service website.
An acronym for Every Day Is Exactly the Same, a Nine Inch Nails single.